This is a list of historical settlement houses.  There were notable historic settlement houses in both England and the United States, at least.

See also
List of active settlement houses
List of settlement houses in Chicago

References

Further reading 
 Woods, Robert Archey; Kennedy, Albert Joseph, eds. (1911). Handbook of Settlements., Charities Publication Committee, New York, The Russel Sage Foundation.

Settlement houses